HD 113538 (Gliese 496.1)  is a star with two planetary companions in the southern constellation of Centaurus. It is much too faint to be viewed with the naked eye at an apparent visual magnitude of 9.05. The distance to this star is 53 light years and it is drifting further away with a radial velocity of +39 km/s.

This is a K-type main-sequence star of a late spectral type, classified as K9Vk:. It displays chromospheric activity with a stellar cycle of at least four years and is metal poor. The star has 58.5% of the mass and 53% of the radius of the Sun. It is radiating just 12.7% of the luminosity of the Sun from its photosphere at an effective temperature of 4,462 K.

Planetary system 
Radial velocity variation of HD 113538 was inferred from observations with the HARPS spectrograph. The star is active (Log R'HK −4.697, SMW 1.05), but the RV variation is not correlated with activity, indicating that planets are responsible. The data is fitted well by a solution including two planets, with an eccentric Saturn-mass planet and a more massive planet on a longer-period orbit—similar to the orbital architecture of the planetary system orbiting HD 163607, though with lower masses. Similar to HD 163607 b, the eccentricity and argument of periastron of HD 113538 b increases the planet's transit probability substantially more than it would be on a circular orbit.

References 

K-type main-sequence stars
Planetary systems with two confirmed planets

Centaurus (constellation)
Durchmusterung objects
Gliese and GJ objects
113538
063833